G. Walter Dittmar (1872–1949) was an American dentist.

He was born in a log cabin in Derinda, Illinois, and was educated at Logan School, Philomath College, and Northwestern University Dental School.

He practiced dentistry in Apple River, Illinois, then went to Chicago to work with a well–known dentist, Dr. Galilee. He began his own successful practice and was in the Who's Who of Chicago in 1920.

He married Agnes Dooling in Galena, Illinois, in 1904. He had three children, Charlotte, Katherine, and George Walter, Jr.

He began his career on the faculty of the Illinois School of Dentistry in 1898. A professor and head of prosthetic dentistry, materia medica, and therapeutics, he published 43 dental research articles in the late 19th and early 20th centuries.

A popular teacher because of his genial personality, Dittmar is considered the "father" of the Department of Prosthetic Dentistry (now the Department of Restorative Dentistry) at the UIC College of Dentistry.

Dittmar achieved a national reputation as a writer, teacher, speaker, and executive. He made the University of Illinois College of Dentistry a national force when he became the first president of the Illinois State Dental Society, and later became the president of the American Dental Association, organized American dentistry's highest post.

References

American dentists
1872 births
1949 deaths
University of Illinois Chicago faculty
American dentistry academics
Northwestern University Dental School alumni
Date of birth missing
Date of death missing